George Henry Charles Byng, 3rd Earl of Strafford (22 February 1830 – 28 March 1898), styled Viscount Enfield between 1860 and 1886, was a British Liberal politician.

Background and education
Byng was the eldest son of George Byng, 2nd Earl of Strafford and his wife, Lady Agnes, daughter of Henry Paget, 1st Marquess of Anglesey. He was educated at Eton and graduated from Christ Church, Oxford in 1852.

Political career
In 1852 Byng entered Parliament as Member of Parliament for Tavistock, a seat he held until 1857, when he became MP for Middlesex. He served under Lord Russell as Parliamentary Secretary to the Poor Law Board between 1865 and 1866 and under William Ewart Gladstone as Under-Secretary of State for Foreign Affairs between 1871 and 1874.

In 1874, Lord Enfield left the House of Commons when he was defeated at the general election, but was then called up to the House of Lords in his father's barony of Strafford. He again held office under Gladstone as a Lord-in-waiting in 1880 and as Under-Secretary of State for India between 1880 and 1883.

Lord Strafford was also First Civil Service Commissioner from 1880 to 1888 and Lord Lieutenant of Middlesex from 1884 to 1888. When the first Middlesex County Council was formed in 1889, he was chosen as a County Alderman, serving until 1895. Throughout his political career, he served with the part-time Royal West Middlesex Militia, becoming Lieutenant-Colonel on 30 October 1853 when his father was the Colonel. On 21 September 1871 he took over from his father as Honorary Colonel of the regiment, being succeeded in his turn by his younger brother Henry on 15 June 1878. 

In 1886, he succeeded his father in the earldom of Strafford.

Interests 
He was the third President of the Folklore Society, serving in that role between 1885 and 1888.  It has been argued that his links with the Society should be seen more as "aristocratic patronage" rather than active research interest in the topic.

Family 
Lord Strafford married Lady Alice Harriet Frederica, eldest daughter of Francis Egerton, 1st Earl of Ellesmere, on 25 July 1854. They had no children. He died at the family home in St. James's Square in March 1898, aged 68, and was succeeded in the earldom by his younger brother, Henry. The Countess of Strafford died in December 1928.

References

External links 
 

1830 births
1898 deaths
Earls in the Peerage of the United Kingdom
Enfield, George Byng, Viscount
Liberal Party (UK) Lords-in-Waiting
Lord-Lieutenants of Middlesex
Presidents of Middlesex County Cricket Club
Enfield, George Byng, Viscount
Enfield, George Byng, Viscount
Enfield, George Byng, Viscount
Enfield, George Byng, Viscount
Enfield, George Byng, Viscount
UK MPs who inherited peerages
People educated at Eton College
Alumni of Christ Church, Oxford
George
Members of Middlesex County Council
Members of the Parliament of the United Kingdom for Tavistock
Presidents of the Folklore Society
Middlesex Militia officers